William Maurice Jennings (17 November 1879 – 27 February 1943) was an Australian rules footballer who played with St Kilda in the Victorian Football League (VFL).

Bill Jennings died in 1943 and is buried at Burwood Cemetery.

References

External links 

1879 births
1943 deaths
Australian rules footballers from Ballarat
St Kilda Football Club players